Magia (Magic) is the fifth studio album recorded by Puerto Rican salsa singer Jerry Rivera released on June 27, 1995.

Track listing
This information adapted from Allmusic.

Chart performance

Certification

See also
List of number-one Billboard Tropical Albums from the 1990s

References

1995 albums
Jerry Rivera albums
Sony Discos albums